The Mariana Grajales Women's Platoon, or , was an all-female military platoon created by Fidel Castro, Celia Sánchez, and Haydée Santamaría during the 26th of July Movement on 4 September 1958, named after the Cuban icon Mariana Grajales Cuello who served in the Cuban War of Independence.

History 
After a group of women led by Isabel Rielo pleaded with Fidel Castro to create a women's unit, Castro summoned the leaders of the rebel army for a debate on 3 September 1958. After seven hours of discussion, at about 1a.m. Castro authorized the creation of the platoon. Isabel Rielo was selected to lead the platoon as the result of a shooting test.

It is estimated by several accounts that women only made up about 5% of the total rebel forces during the Cuban Revolution. So the Mariana Grajales Platoon, which was composed of 13 young women, was a unique component of the revolutionary army.
The platoon was essential in the rebels' 28 September 1958 victory over the Batista forces at Cerro Pelado (near modern-day Bartolomé Masó) after a three-day battle.

Members of the platoon used M1 carbines as their weapon of choice.

Following victory in January 1959, the members of the platoon worked to build schools in the mountainous portion of eastern Cuba.

On 4 September 1988, the 30th anniversary of the founding of the platoon, a commemorative event was held at the headquarters of the Women's Anti-Air Artillery Regiment. In attendance were Vilma Espín, president of the Federation of Cuban Women, Nguyễn Thị Định, then-Vice President of Vietnam and member of the Central Committee of the Communist Party of Vietnam, and Corps General Julio Casas Regueiro of the Revolutionary Armed Forces.

Members 
 Haydée Santamaría
 Isabel Rielo Rodríguez (commanding officer)
 Teté Puebla (second-in-command)
 Olga Guevara Pérez
 Eva Palma Rodríguez
 Lilia Rielo Rodríguez
 Rita García Reyes
 Angelina Antolín Escalona
 Edemis Tamayo Núñez
 Norma Ferrer Benítez
 Flor Pérez Chávez
 Juana Peña Peña
 Orosia Soto Sardiña
 Ada Bella Acosta Pompa

See also 
 Dickey Chapelle, an American photojournalist who reported on the Cuban Revolution and observed the platoon from the rebels' side 
 Federation of Cuban Women

References

Further reading 
 Marianas in Combat: Teté Puebla and the Mariana Grajales Women's Platoon in Cuba's Revolutionary War 1956-58

All-female military units and formations
History of Cuba
Military history of Cuba
History of women in Cuba